KDK may refer to:
 KDK, the brand to manufacture the ventilating products
 Kindle Development Kit, the development kit for the Amazon Kindle
 Kodiak Municipal Airport, the IATA code KDK
 ISO 639:kdk, the ISO 639 code for the Numèè language